SB-357134 is a drug which is used in scientific research. It acts as a potent, selective and orally active 5-HT6 receptor antagonist. SB-357134 and other 5-HT6 antagonists show nootropic effects in animal studies, and have been proposed as potential novel treatments for cognitive disorders such as schizophrenia and Alzheimer's disease.

References 

5-HT6 antagonists
N-(2-methoxyphenyl)piperazines
Sulfonamides
Bromoarenes
Fluoroarenes